The following is a list of the lieutenant governors of New Brunswick. Though the present day office of the lieutenant governor in New Brunswick came into being only upon the province's entry into Canadian Confederation in 1867, the post is a continuation from the first governorship of New Brunswick in 1786. This list also includes a number of the individuals, primarily Chief Justices, who acted briefly as de facto interim lieutenant governors for short periods of time. For instance, when lieutenant governors died in office. These individuals were generally not sworn in as actual lieutenant governors, they merely temporarily assumed the responsibilities of the Lieutenant Governor until a new person was appointed to the position. These "interim" lieutenant governors are identified in the list below as "admin".

Lieutenant governors of New Brunswick, 1786–1867

Lieutenant governors of New Brunswick, 1867–present

See also
 Office-holders of Canada
 Canadian incumbents by year

Notes

External links

 

New Brunswick
Lieutenant Governors